Trogloconcha lozoueti is a species of sea snail, a marine gastropod mollusk in the family Larocheidae.

Description

Distribution

References

 Geiger D.L. (2008). New species of scissurellids from the Austral Islands, French Polynesia, and the Indo-Malayan Archipelago (Gastropoda: Vetigastropoda: Scissurellidae, Anatomidae, Larocheidae). The Nautilus 122(4): 185-200

External links

Larocheidae
Gastropods described in 2008